Raciborowice Górne  is a village in the administrative district of Gmina Warta Bolesławiecka, within Bolesławiec County, Lower Silesian Voivodeship, in south-western Poland. Its name means "Upper Raciborowice" (as distinct from Raciborowice Dolne, "Lower Raciborowice").

References

Villages in Bolesławiec County